A list of notable non-governmental organizations working in Nepal.

Social sector

Human rights

Women

Youth Services

Children

Minorities

Infrastructure

Rural and community development

Health

Education

Agriculture and environment

Biodiversity

Climate change

Forestry

Agriculture development

See also
:Category: Non-profit organisations based in Nepal

References

External links
 NGO Federation of Nepal
 "NGOs affiliated with Social Welfare Council (2034 - 2067 Ashad masant)". Social Welfare Council Nepal. Retrieved October 10, 2017.

NGO Nepal